{{DISPLAYTITLE:Psi2 Orionis}}

Psi2 Orionis a binary star system in the equatorial constellation of Orion. It has an apparent visual magnitude of 4.6, indicating that it is visible to the naked eye. Based upon an annual parallax shift of 2.87 mass, it is roughly 1,100 light years distant from the Sun.

This is a double-lined spectroscopic binary, which means that the individual absorption lines of both components can be discerned. The pair orbit each other with a period of 2.526 days and a low eccentricity of 0.04. The close orbit is causing their mutual gravitational interaction to distort the shapes of the stars, turning this system into an ellipsoidal variable. The inclination of orbital plane is sufficiently low that the two stars form a grazing eclipsing binary. During the eclipse of the primary component, the visual magnitude is reduced by 0.06, whereas the secondary eclipse reduces the magnitude by 0.03.  The brightness variability has led to the star being classified as a  pulsating Beta Cephei variable, but no evidence has been found of pulsations superimposed on the variability due to ellipsoidal rotations and eclipses.

The combined spectrum of Psi2 Orionis matches that of a B-type subgiant star with a stellar classification of B2 IV. The primary component is an evolved giant star with a class of B1 III, while the secondary is a B-type main sequence star with a classification of B2 V.

References

B-type giants
B-type main-sequence stars
Orionis, Psi2
Orion (constellation)
Durchmusterung objects
Orionis, 37 40
035715
026176 366
01811
Spectroscopic binaries
Eclipsing binaries